The Roman Catholic Diocese of Goaso is a diocese located in the city of Goaso in the Ecclesiastical province of Kumasi in Ghana.

History
 October 24, 1997: Established as Diocese of Goaso from the Diocese of Sunyani

Special churches
The Cathedral is Cathedral of St. Anthony in Goaso.

Leadership
 Bishops of Goaso (Roman rite)
 Bishop Peter Kwaku Atuahene (since October 24, 1997)

See also
Roman Catholicism in Ghana

Sources
 GCatholic.org
 Catholic Hierarchy

Goaso
Goaso
Christian organizations established in 1997
Roman Catholic dioceses and prelatures established in the 20th century
Roman Catholic Ecclesiastical Province of Kumasi